Sajid is a male Arabic name. It means "one who bows down to God". It may refer to:

 Sajid dynasty, an Islamic dynasty that ruled the Iranian region of Azerbaijan in the 9th and 10th centuries AD

People
 Sajid Khan (music director), Hindi music composer and director, part of the brother duo Sajid-Wajid
 Saajid Badat (born 1979), British student, imprisoned for planning to blow up an aircraft with a bomb hidden in his shoe
 Sajid Hasan, Pakistani actor
 Sajid Javid (born 1969), English politician
 Sajid Khan (born 1951), Indian actor
 Sajid Khan (director) (born 1970), Indian filmmaker
 Sajid Mahmood (born 1981), English cricketer
 Sajid Naqvi (born 1940), Pakistani politician
 Sajid Shah (born 1974), Pakistani cricketer
 Sajid Tarar, American politician

Places
Sajid, Saudi Arabia

See also
 Sajida, female version
 Sajda (disambiguation)
 Sujud (disambiguation)

Arabic masculine given names